Carl Allen (December 21, 1955 - March 31, 2021) was born in Hattiesburg, Mississippi) and was a cornerback in the National Football League. He was drafted by the Cincinnati Bengals in the 11th round of the 1977 NFL Draft but played his entire career with the St. Louis Cardinals. He played college football at Southern Miss.

NFL career 
After bring drafted by the Bengals, Allen was traded to the Cardinals for a future draft pick on August 30, 1977.
 
He had his only career touchdown on a 70-yard interception return in a September 28, 1980, game against the Philadelphia Eagles.

Allen was placed on injured reserve on November 18, 1981, due to a knee injury against the Buffalo Bills.

Retirement
Allen retired in St. Louis where he taught and coached in the Jennings School District. He served as quarterback and defensive back coach and was part of five district championships and the first non-conference championship in 2006. He retired from coaching in 2012 and retired from teaching in 2020.

Carl Allen died March 31, 2021, at the age of 65.

References 

1955 births
2021 deaths
American football cornerbacks
Southern Miss Golden Eagles football players
St. Louis Cardinals (football) players
San Antonio Gunslingers players
Pittsburgh Gladiators players
People from Hattiesburg, Mississippi